Rhyssa is a genus of ichneumon wasps belonging to the family Ichneumonidae subfamily Rhyssinae.

Etymology 
The Latin name of the genus comes from the Greek and means "wrinkled".

Description
Female of this parasitic species drills deep into wood by its hair thin ovipositor (terebra) and lays its eggs on larvae living in timber, which become a food supply and an incubator for the progeny, until it is fully grown.

Distribution
Species of this genus are present in most of Europe, the Australian region, the Near East, in the Nearctic realm, the Indomalayan realm, and in North Africa.

Selected species

References 

 zipcodezoo.com
 BugGuide Genus Rhyssa
 Fauna Europaea

Ichneumonoidea genera
Ichneumonidae